Lighthouse: Center for Human Trafficking Victims is a nonprofit organization based in Tokyo, Japan working to eradicate human trafficking and modern day slavery.  It used to be known as "Polaris Project Japan".

History and purpose
Lighthouse was founded in August 2004 by Shihoko Fujiwara. The following year, Lighthouse established the only nationwide consultation hotline for trafficking victims and those wishing to report possible trafficking activity in Japan.  Since then, the consultation hotline has been used as a source of trafficking tips throughout the nation.  The hotline provides consultations to about a hundred victims or family members annually.

In addition to maintaining its consultation and tip hotline, the organization engages in public awareness and advocacy work. For example, the Director called for materials involving children under 18 clearly created for the purpose of fulfilling sexual excitement to be regulated as child pornography.

Honorable recognition
In 2011, Lighthouse's Director and Founder Shihoko Fujiwara was named one of the "100 People Remaking Japan"  by Aera Magazine, and in 2012 she spoke about the Japanese sex trade at the TED@Tokyo Talent search.

References

Human rights organizations based in Japan
Abolitionism in Asia
Organizations that combat human trafficking
Organizations established in 2004
Human trafficking in Japan
Slavery in Japan